The 2016–17 Vanderbilt Commodores women's basketball team will represent Vanderbilt University in the 2016–17 NCAA Division I women's basketball season. The Commodores, led by first year head coach Stephanie White, play their home games at Memorial Gymnasium and were members of the Southeastern Conference. They finished the season 14–16, 4–12 in SEC play to finish in thirteenth place. They lost in the first round of the SEC women's tournament to Alabama.

Roster

Schedule

|-
!colspan=12 style="background:#000000; color:#BDAE79;"| Exhibition

|-
!colspan=12 style="background:#000000; color:#BDAE79;"| Non-conference regular season

|-
!colspan=12 style="background:#000000; color:#BDAE79;"| SEC regular season

|-
!colspan=12 style="background:#000000; color:#BDAE79;"| SEC Women's Tournament

Rankings

References

See also
2016–17 Vanderbilt Commodores men's basketball team

Vanderbilt
Vanderbilt Commodores women's basketball seasons